Shizu Saldamando (born 1978 in San Francisco, CA), is an American visual artist. Her work merges painting and collage (often using origami paper) in portraits that often deal with social constructs of identity and subcultures. She has worked in the genre of arte paño, a type of prison art involving portraits of family members and friends drawn in ball-point pen on napkins or handkerchiefs.  Saldamando also works in video, installation and performance art.

Biography
Saldamando was born in 1978 to parents of Mexican-American and Japanese-American descent. She was raised in the Mission District of San Francisco. She attended the California Institute of Arts and the University of California, Los Angeles School of Arts and Architecture.

Her work was included in the group exhibition "Portraiture Now: Asian American Portraits of Encounter" at the National Portrait Gallery, Smithsonian Institution in 2011, Her work was also shown in "We Must Risk Delight: Twenty Artists from Los Angeles," curated by Elizabeta Betinski as an official collateral exhibition of the 56th Venice Biennale.  She was a resident artist at the Art Omi International Artist Colony in 2002.

Quotes
"A lot of what I try to capture are different subcultures or scenes in which people have created their own world outside of larger alienating constructs."

"My friends and I would buy Teen Angels, a magazine of lowrider and cholo art, and try to copy the drawings of Aztec pyramids and warriors and naked girls. I think that's how I got good at ballpoint pen renderings."

"Growing up in the Mission district in San Francisco, it was predominantly a hip-hop culture. Here in Los Angeles, I'd go to shows or house parties, and it would be all Latino kids listening to the Cure and the Smiths. In L.A., I felt normal for the first time."

References

1978 births
Living people
21st-century American women artists
20th-century American painters
Artists from San Francisco
Collage artists
California Institute of the Arts alumni
University of California, Los Angeles alumni
21st-century American painters
20th-century American women